The February 2010 Karachi bombings were a series of two bombings in Karachi in Pakistan on 5 February 2010. At least 25 people died and more than 50 were injured. The attacks which targeted Shia Muslims happened on Arba'een, a religious observation that occurs 40 days after the Day of Ashura.

Attacks
The first bombing occurred when a suicide bomber on a motorcycle laden with explosives hit a bus carrying Shia pilgrims. Twelve people died. The bomb disposal squad said that the bike rider was wearing a suicide jacket with 15-20kg of explosives. About an hour later, another blast occurred just outside the emergency ward of Jinnah hospital where many victims from the first blast were being cared for. At least 10 were killed in this blast.

See also
List of terrorist incidents, 2010
List of terrorist incidents in Pakistan since 2001
Sectarian violence in Pakistan

References

External links
In pictures: Shia festival bomb attacks

2010 murders in Pakistan
Attacks on hospitals
Mass murder in 2010
Suicide bombings in Pakistan
Terrorist incidents in Pakistan in 2010
Crime in Karachi
2010s in Karachi
Violence against Shia Muslims in Pakistan
February 2010 events in Pakistan
Terrorist incidents in Karachi
Building bombings in Pakistan